Kim Kyu-pyo (born 8 February 1999) is a South Korean footballer currently playing as a midfielder for Hwaseong FC in the K3 League.

Career statistics

Club

Notes

References

1999 births
Living people
Sungkyunkwan University alumni
South Korean footballers
Association football midfielders
K League 2 players
Jeonnam Dragons players
Pohang Steelers players
Gyeongnam FC players